Sicangu is an unincorporated community and census-designated place (CDP) in Todd County, South Dakota, United States, within the Rosebud Indian Reservation. It was first listed as a CDP prior to the 2020 census. The population of the CDP was 276 at the 2020 census.

It is in the southern part of the county, on the east side of U.S. Route 83.

Demographics

References 

Census-designated places in Todd County, South Dakota
Census-designated places in South Dakota